The ochre-lored flatbill (Tolmomyias flaviventris) or yellow-breasted flycatcher, is a passerine bird in the tyrant flycatcher family. It is found in South America, ranging from Colombia and Venezuela south to  Peru, Bolivia, and Brazil, and on both Trinidad and Tobago. There are significant variations in its voice and plumage, with western birds duller and more olive, and eastern and northern birds brighter and more ochre-yellow. The two are sometimes considered separate species, the western olive-faced flatbill (or flycatcher), T. viridiceps, and the eastern and northern ochre-lored flatbill (or flycatcher), T. flaviventris.

This species is found in secondary growth and the edges of mangrove swamps.  The bottle nest is made of plant fibre and suspended from a branch, usually near a wasp nest, which presumably provides some protection from predators. The typical clutch is two or three creamy white eggs, which are marked with violet, mostly at the larger end. Incubation by the female is 17 days to hatching.

The ochre-lored flatbill is approximately 12.7 cm long and weighs 11.3 g. The head and upperparts are olive-green with darker, yellow-edged, wing and tail feathers. There are two yellowish wing bars. The throat, breast and eye-ring are golden yellow, the lores are ochreous, and the abdomen is dull yellow. The bill is flattened laterally, and is black above and white below. Sexes are similar. There are other races, differing in the tone of the upperpart or underpart colour.

Ochre-lored flatbills are inconspicuous birds, tending to keep to high perches from which they sally forth to catch insects. The call is a loud whistled peeee-it.

References

Further reading

External links
Xeno-canto: audio recordings of the ochre-lored flatbill

ochre-lored flatbill
Birds of Brazil
Birds of Colombia
Birds of Venezuela
Birds of Trinidad and Tobago
Birds of the Guianas
Birds of the Caatinga
Birds of the Atlantic Forest
ochre-lored flatbill